= Mesenteric pseudocyst =

- Other names: Pseudomesenteric cyst
- Specialty: Dermatology

Mesenteric pseudocyst, or pseudomesenteric cyst) is a mass in the abdomen that is devoid of any epithelial lining. They are caused either due to trauma or infection. The term mesenteric pseudocyst was first used by Ros et al in 1987. Mesenteric pseudocysts are very rare, making up only about less than one in 250,000 hospital admissions.
